Thomas Inglis Kidd (December 12, 1860 – November 8, 1941) was a Scottish-born American labor union leader.

Born in Edinburgh, Kidd began working as a laborer when he was ten years old, before becoming a woodworker.  In 1885, he emigrated to the United States, settling in Nebraska, before moving to Denver.  There, he founded a local union of woodworkers, which in 1890 joined the new Machine Wood Workers' International Union of America.  Kidd was elected as secretary of the new union, and also became editor of its journal, the Machine Wood Worker.  In 1892, he moved to Chicago, where he was a leading supporter of the Populist Party.

In 1896, Kidd took his union into a merger, which formed the Amalgamated Woodworkers' International Union of America.  He became secretary of the new union, and also editor of its journal, The International Wood Worker.  From 1899, he was a vice president of the American Federation of Labor (AFL).  In 1904, he stood down from his union, to become a full-time organizer for the AFL.  However, in 1907, he left the union movement entirely, to become a sales representative for the Brunswick-Balke-Collender Company, and was promoted to become a branch manager in 1913.

References

1860 births
1941 deaths
American trade union leaders
People from Edinburgh
Scottish emigrants to the United States